Events in 1997 in Japanese television.

Events
February 8- The final episode of the popular anime series Sailor Moon is aired.
September 1- Cartoon Network launches in Japan.
December 16–Denno Senshi Porygon, an episode of Pokémon, is aired on TV Tokyo in Japan. 20 minutes in the episode, Ash Ketchum's Pikachu uses his Thunderbolt attack on vaccine missiles, causing red and blue strobe lights flashing rapidly. This gives 685 viewers (310 boys and 375 girls) seizures and causes Indigo League (The series of Pokémon) to go into hiatus until April 1998. Its time slot was taken over by Class King Yamazaki (学級王ヤマザキ).

Debuting this year

Ongoing shows
Music Fair, music (1964–present)
Mito Kōmon, jidaigeki (1969-2011)
Sazae-san, anime (1969–present)
FNS Music Festival, music (1974–present)
Panel Quiz Attack 25, game show (1975–present)
Doraemon, anime (1979-2005)
Soreike! Anpanman, anime (1988–present)
Downtown no Gaki no Tsukai ya Arahende!!, game show (1989–present)
Crayon Shin-chan, anime (1992–present)
Shima Shima Tora no Shimajirō, anime (1993-2008)
Nintama Rantarō, anime (1993–present)
Chibi Maruko-chan, anime (1995–present)
Azuki-chan, anime (1995–1998)
Kodomo no Omocha, anime (1996-1998)
Kochira Katsushika-ku Kameari Kōen-mae Hashutsujo, anime (1996-2004)
Rurouni Kenshin: Meiji Swordsman Romantic Story, anime (1996-1998)
Detective Conan, anime (1996–present)

Hiatus

Endings

See also
1997 in anime
List of Japanese television dramas
1997 in Japan
List of Japanese films of 1997

References